WNNJ (103.7 FM) is a Class B1 radio station licensed to Newton, New Jersey. They serve the Sussex County, New Jersey radio market while also reaching northeastern Pennsylvania and Orange County, New York. The station is owned by iHeartMedia, Inc. WNNJ offers a classic rock format focusing on 1970s, '80s and '90s rock. They also mix in some 1960s and current rock as well. The station is known as "103-7 WNNJ The Tri States' Rock Station". The station achieves high ratings as well. The legal call letters of this station were WNNJ-FM from the Summer of 1988 until June 30, 2008. The FM was dropped that day because their AM sister station on 1360 changed its call letters from WNNJ (which they had since 1953) to WTOC.

History
The station was originally known as WNNJ-FM and signed on in 1962 and was locally owned by Simpson Wolfe, incorporated as Sussex County Broadcasters, along with 1360 WNNJ (which became WTOC July 2008 and went silent on August 17, 2011, and signed back on that December). Initially WNNJ-FM simulcast the Middle of the Road format on 1360 WNNJ during the day. Then after the former WNNJ (AM) signed off for the night (WNNJ was a daytimer) WNNJ-FM played classical music like most FM radio stations. In the mid-1960s as the FCC was requiring WNNJ-FM separated from WNNJ. The station was renamed WIXL and they offered a "beautiful music" format. The station played mostly easy listening instrumental versions of pop tunes along with a couple soft vocalists per hour.

The format did not do very well because similarly formatted stations from the Lehigh Valley and New York City reached Sussex County. The owners did a format study in the Summer of 1976. The conclusion was that country music fans were underserved in Sussex County. WHN out of New York City was on AM plus they played pop tunes mixed in. A few miles away in Franklin, New Jersey WSUS played a format of 50% top 40 Hits and 50% country music. WSUS did switch formats at night to a top 40/rock format keeping the pop and country mix format during the day for the next few years. So it was decided that WIXL would go country full-time. In November 1976 WIXL 103.7 became "XL Country".  Two years later it would be known as the "Home Of Great American Music".

As a country station they played deep cuts by well known country music artists. Some crossover material was heard but it was the hard core country sound that drove this station. Core artists included Merle Haggard, Waylon Jennings, Tanya Tucker, Sonny James, Charlie Pride, Dolly Parton, and many others. The station also played an occasional bluegrass song as well. They even had a bluegrass show on Sunday evenings. Additionally the station had New York Mets baseball and New York Giants football as well as auto racing at some points.

In 1979, Simpson Wolfe sold WIXL along with WNNJ to Marvin Strauzer and Michael Levine under the name Group M Communications. The country music format would continue on WIXL. In 1982 though the format evolved to include more crossover material. Early in 1983 the bluegrass show was canceled. After that WIXL began mixing in a lot of non-country songs with a slight twang into the format. Songs such as "Turn Turn Turn by the Byrds, "You Were on My Mind" by We Five, and "Classical Gas" by Mason Williams were mixed into the format. Well known crossover country artists like Kenny Rogers, John Denver, the Eagles, and Eddie Rabbitt were played as well as cuts by artists like Neil Young, Lynyrd Skynyrd, Rita Coolidge, The Carpenters, and others added to the mix in moderation.

WIXL continued with a country format through most of the 1980s, but as demographics began to change, a format study was done late in 1986. The conclusion was that there was a need for another contemporary music station in the market. Plans for a format change were made early in 1988 for Labor Day weekend. However, competition heard these rumors and out of fear they flipped their own formats. The first to was WIXL, which dropped its country music format May 28, 1988 at noon.

This format change faced a lot of controversy. Now country music fans could only get their music on NBC's 97.1 WYNY in New York City which had a spotty signal but still could be received standing still. Later that year Westwood One acquired the WYNY Country Unit and moved it to 103.5. Because of 103.5 FM's proximity to 103.7 WYNY could no longer be received in the WIXL listening area. As a result, Sussex County residents could not get country music on the radio. Eleven months later, though Class B station WRWD 107.3 in Highland, NY signed on with a Country Music format in September 1989. This would reach much of Sussex County, NJ at least and southern Warren County could get country music on Philadelphia based WXTU. Still few in Sussex Country were aware of WRWD. Also WGBI out of Scranton, Pennsylvania reached areas of Sussex and Warren Counties playing Country Music. Finally, four years later 106.3 WFMV became "Hot Country WHCY", bringing country music back to the area. (WHCY would drop the format in 2000.). Soon after in 1992, FM 107.1 WRNJ-FM Belvidere, NJ also signed on with a country music format (which was sold to Big City Radio and became part of the Y 107 Quadcast keeping Country till the spring of 2002 but had since flipped to Spanish, went silent, returned in 2003 as an AC station, flipped to hard rock a few years later, and now is an Alternative Music station. Today 96.1 WCTO Cat Country in the Lehigh Valley is the primary country music station for the area (as well as WRWD).

The station became a straightforward Contemporary hit radio station. the entire airstaff stayed on. WIXL became known as "Power 103". The music was a blend of rock, dance, heavy metal, R & B, and Pop adult contemporary crossovers. The station would be deeper than most CHR stations however. Later that year the station dropped the WIXL call letters and reverted to WNNJ-FM.

This Top 40 format did well but in 1992 the station dropped the Power 103 name to simply be known as 103.7 WNNJ-FM following the departure of PD Larry Bear.  The station followed a Hot AC format until 1997, with much success. In the fall of 1996 WNNJ-FM along with 1360/WNNJ were sold to Nassau Broadcasting. During this time management changes were made.

In January 1997 half the airstaff exited and new D.J.s were mixed in. The station cut back the news department as well. The Adult Top 40 format was also dropped. WNNJ-FM then flipped to a pop-based rock format focusing on '70s pop rock. The station became known as "Classic Hits 103-7". Musically Classic Hits 103-7 played rock oriented songs from 1964 to 1989. The focus was '70s rock hits. Mixed in were hard rock hits as well as pop hits from the '70s that were not too far out of the realm of rock. Also big '80s rock hits and some big hits from the late 1960s were also played. The station earned high ratings with this format. In September 1998 Chuck Seese and Deanne Schulz were teamed to host the morning show, replacing Pat Butler. Disc Jockeys during this era included Christa Robinson, Chip Miller, Mike Malone, Vince Thomas, Brett Alan, Andy Roberts, Frank Bruno, and others.

More personnel changes came in August 2000, as a change in ownership was coming. Chuck Seese returned to Nassau's WSBG in Stroudsburg PA, and Schulz became a publicity expert. In the Winter of 2001 Nassau sold WNNJ-FM along with WNNJ 1360, WSUS, WHCY, and local marketing agreements for WDLC and WTSX to Clear Channel Communications in exchange for cash, WEEX, and WODE-FM located in the Lehigh valley. Those Lehigh Valley stations would become Nassau stations.

Classic Hits 103.7 only made a few slight changes initially. But musically over the next few years the station moved to more of a regular classic rock format. In the fall of 2003 the station dropped the name "Classic Hits 103.7" and became "103.7 WNNJ The Tri State's Classic Rock Station". The airstaff changed gradually and by 2004 was totally different from what it had been under Nassau. It also added the syndicated Nights with Alice Cooper show in the evenings. Eventually, the Alice Cooper show was dropped.

On July 1, 2008, WNNJ-FM officially changed its call letters to WNNJ, because 1360 WNNJ modified its format and changed its call letters to WTOC. Because the FM station no longer shared call letters with an AM station, FM will no longer be part of the call letters for 103.7.

On July 9, 2012, Gary Cee, formerly of WPDH, became the Program Director of WNNJ.  Cee is also the Director of Operations of Clear Channel TriState Radio and the station's afternoon host.

Facilities
WNNJ's transmitter is located in Frankford Township and transmits at 2,300 Watts as a Class B1 FM station. Originally the transmitter was located in Andover Township in Springdale (a couple miles from where WNNJ 1360's transmitter still is). The station wanted to relocate the tower in Fredon but faced a lot of opposition. Finally in 1986 they began transmitting at their present location. The station was located in Andover Township outside of Newton for many years as well. Finally in September 2004 they moved into state of the art facilities in Franklin on Mitchell Avenue along with other Clear Channel stations in the Sussex cluster.

Schedule
Currently, WNNJ's schedule is:

References

External links
The Rock Station 103.7 Website

NNJ
Classic rock radio stations in the United States
Radio stations established in 1961
1961 establishments in New Jersey
IHeartMedia radio stations